Shane Mack may refer to:

Shane Mack (baseball) (born 1963), former professional baseball player
Shane Mack (singer) (born 1974), country music singer